Yuriy Mykolaiovych Sergiyenko (born 19 March 1965) is a Ukrainian former track and field athlete who competed in the high jump. He competed internationally for the Soviet Union, the Unified Team, and finally Ukraine.

Sergiyenko was the European Junior champion in 1983 and won the bronze medal at the 1991 Summer Universiade. After representing the Unified Team at the 1992 Summer Olympics, he won the gold medal at the 1992 IAAF World Cup. His final international appearance came at the 1993 IAAF World Indoor Championships. He was a two-time Ukrainian national champion – being the first man to take the high jump title after the country's independence.

Career
The best jump of his career came in 1985 at the age of twenty. He won his first and final international medal for the Soviet Union at the 1991 Universiade.

Sergiyenko began competing for Ukraine in the 1992 season, following the dissolution of the Soviet Union. This change marked a resurgence in the athlete's form. He was victorious at the Brothers Znamensky Memorial in an outdoor best-equalling mark of 2.31 m. His first medal senior gold medal followed at the 1992 IAAF World Cup in Havana, where he beat home favourite Javier Sotomayor to the title. He equalled his personal best of 2.34 m at the start of 1993 and won selection for Ukraine for the 1993 IAAF World Indoor Championships and cleared 2.31 m in the final to take sixth place.

This proved to be the last time in his career that the Ukrainian cleared the two metres and thirty centimetres mark. He won his second Ukrainian title in 1994 and was the 1996 Europa SC High Jump winner. Reaching his mid-thirties, the 1998 season was the last in which he jumped over 2.20 m and he retired from athletics in 1999.

Personal bests
High jump outdoor –  (1993)
High jump indoor –  (1985 and 1993)

National titles
Ukrainian Athletics Championships
High jump: 1992, 1994

International competitions

See also
List of high jump national champions (men)

References

External links

Living people
1965 births
Ukrainian male high jumpers
Soviet male high jumpers
Olympic athletes of the Unified Team
Athletes (track and field) at the 1992 Summer Olympics
Universiade medalists in athletics (track and field)
Universiade bronze medalists for the Soviet Union
Medalists at the 1991 Summer Universiade
Sportspeople from Luhansk Oblast